Aerobic anoxygenic phototrophic bacteria (AAPBs) are Alphaproteobacteria and Gammaproteobacteria that are obligate aerobes that capture energy from light by anoxygenic photosynthesis. Anoxygenic photosynthesis is the phototrophic process where light energy is captured and stored as ATP. The production of oxygen is non-existent and, therefore, water is not used as an electron donor.  They are widely distributed marine bacteria that may constitute over 10% of the open ocean microbial community.  They can be particularly abundant in oligotrophic conditions where they were found to be 24% of the community. Aerobic anoxygenic phototrophic bacteria are photoheterotrophic (phototroph) microbes that exist in a variety of aquatic environments. Most are obligately aerobic, meaning they require oxygen to grow. One aspect of these bacteria is that they, unlike other similar bacteria, are unable to utilize BChl (bacteriochlorophyll) for anaerobic growth. The only photosynthetic pigment that exists in AAPB is BChl-a.  Anaerobic phototrophic bacteria, on the contrary, can contain numerous species of photosynthetic pigments like bacteriochlorophyll-a. These bacteria can be isolated using carotenoid presence and medias containing organic compounds. Predation, as well as the availability of phosphorus and light, have been shown to be important factors that influence AAPB growth in their natural environments. AAPBs are thought to play an important role in carbon cycling by relying on organic matter substrates and acting as sinks for dissolved organic carbon. There is still a knowledge gap in research areas regarding the abundance and genetic diversity of AAPB, as well as the environmental variables that regulate these two properties.

Cellular Structure
Research suggests that all currently known AAPB contain Gram-negative cell walls. The majority, have shapes that resemble cylinders, as well as flagella and cilia. AAP bacteria are motile due to one polar or subpolar flagellum. Species of these bacteria such as R. denitrificans and S. sibiricus have up to three subpolar flagella. AAPB cell dimensions are normally, 1.2 μm long, 0.7 μm in diameter, and a cell volume of 0.5 μm3. Their dry weight is 0.05 pg and wet weight is 0.5 pg. 3 types of cell division are known to exist within AAPB, 2 daughter-cell division, 4 daughter-cell division, and the non-typical 3 daughter-cell division, commonly referred to as Y-cell division. AAPB are usually pink or orange in color when isolated from water. Current data suggests that marine bacteria have generation times of several days, whereas new evidence exists that shows AAPB to have a much shorter generation time. All species of AAPB produce large amounts of carotenoid pigments. The color of each species is due to the presence of carotenoids, giving peaks in the blue and green absorption spectra. LH complexes with unusual absorption maxima have been discovered due to the isolation and characterization of new aerobic phototrophic species.

A new strain of aerobic anoxygenic phototrophic bacteria, JF-1, was recently isolated from deep-ocean hydrothermal vent waters. These bacteria were found to be pleomorphic which shapes varying from coccoid and ovoid rods, to bean-shaped. The coccoid bacteria were from 0.4 to 0.5 μm in size. The ovoid rods were 0.4-0.5 by 1.0-1.2 μm in size. Thread-like formations of up to five bacterial cells were also observed in these vents.

Taxonomy
Aerobic anoxygenic phototrophic bacteria are divided into two genera. There are two marine (Erythrobacter and Roseobacter) and six freshwater (Acidiphilium, Erythromicrobium, Blastomonas (synonym: Erythromonas), Porphyrobacter, Roseococcus, and Sandaracinobacter) genera of these bacteria. AAP bacteria represent a variety of species that belong to subgroups of Alpha-, Beta- and Gammaproteobacteria. This group of bacteria is divided into six major phyla including Proteobacteria, Chlorobi, Chloroflexi, Firmicutes, Acidobacteria, and Gemmatimonadetes. Of phototrophic prokaryotes in the ocean, AAP bacteria are the third most numerous group.

Carbon Cycling
AAPBs play a key role in carbon cycling but to what extent is still being investigated. The key to determining their role in marine ecosystems was originally thought to be the AAPB in total bacteria (AAPB%), however, this no longer seems to be the case because AAPB have been found to be much larger than other aquatic bacteria and so their actual effect on production is now thought to be much larger than their abundance would suggest. Since AAPB themselves lack a way to fix carbon for themselves, they instead rely or organic matter substrates as a carbon source. Because of this, AAPB are now thought to play an important role in the sequestration of total organic carbon, and act as sinks for dissolved organic carbon. AAPB have also been found to act as sources of total organic carbon in some freshwater systems and to be producers of carbon at groundwater-surface water exchange systems.

Distribution
They are widely distributed in coastal and oceanic environments. AAPB may constitute over 10% of the open ocean microbial community, being particularly abundant in oligotrophic conditions where they were found to make up around 24% of the microbes present. One study revealed that the surface water of the Indian Ocean ranked the highest of the oceans in AAPB% at 3.79. The Atlantic Ocean surface waters followed with 1.57 AAPB%. Last, the Pacific Ocean followed closely at 1.08 AAPB%. There was a positive correlation with oceans that held higher values of AAPB% and those with higher levels of chlorophyll a. More specific, the coastal/shelf waters of these oceans had greater amounts of AAPBs, some as high as 13.51% AAPB%. Phytoplankton also affect AAPB%, but little research has been performed in this area. They can also be abundant in various oligotrophic conditions, including the most oligotrophic regime of the world ocean. They are globally distributed in the euphotic zone and represent a hitherto unrecognized component of the marine microbial community that appears to be critical to the cycling of both organic and inorganic carbon in the ocean.

Isolation, Enrichment, and Maintenance 
Aerobic phototrophic bacteria are unable to be isolated on selective medium. Instead, these bacteria are indicated by the colony color due to presence of carotenoids. Aerobic phototrophic bacteria can be isolated using medias that are rich in organic compounds using direct inoculation of water samples or sand samples. Inoculated plates are prepared in conditions similar to the natural environments of the collected sample to increase survivability of the bacteria. The presence of Bchl a is what separates this bacteria from other heterotrophic bacteria.

Aerobic phototrophic species can remain viable for at least 2 months when stored at 4oC in liquid or on agar surfaces. They can also be preserved long-term by storing in liquid nitrogen or at temperatures -70oC and below.

Limiting Growth Factors 
Compared to most other bacteria in their natural environment, AAPB have a relatively large predation pressure, resulting in high growth rates which balance out the high level of grazing they experience. The removal of predators and this grazing pressure results in a large increase in AAP relative to the other bacteria in the environment. Additionally, phosphorus has been identified as a common limiting factor in AAPB growth, which has been shown to sometimes be a stronger limiting factor to AABP growth than predation. Light availability has also been shown to be a factor that stimulates AAPB population growth. One effect light has on AAP that has been linked to increased growth is that it has been shown to increase the membrane potential of the bacteria. Increased light exposure has also been shown to extenuate the growth rate increase caused by removal of predators and the amendment of phosphorus levels.

References

Sources

 

Pseudomonadota
Phototrophic bacteria